The empress is a fairy chess piece that can move like a rook or a knight. It cannot jump over other pieces when moving as a rook but may do so when moving as a knight. The piece has acquired many names and is frequently called chancellor or marshal.

Chess moves in this article use C as notation for the empress.

Movement
The empress can move as a rook or a knight.

History and nomenclature
The empress is one of the most simply described fairy chess pieces and as such has a long history and has gone by many names. It was first used in Turkish Great Chess, a large medieval variant of chess, where it was called the war machine (dabbabah; not to be confused with the piece more commonly referred to as the dabbaba today, which is the (2,0) leaper). It was introduced in the West with Carrera's chess from 1617, where it was called a champion, and has been used in many chess variants since then.

The name chancellor was introduced by Ben Foster in his large variant Chancellor Chess (chess on a 9×9 board, with a chancellor on the opposite side of the king as the queen), and the name marshal was introduced by L. Tressan in his large variant The Sultan's Game. José Raúl Capablanca used both in his large variant Capablanca Chess: he originally called this piece the marshal, but later changed it to chancellor, which was his original name for the archbishop. Both chancellor and marshal are popular names for the rook+knight compound, although a case could be made for marshal, as the word is related to mare (female horse) and thus fits better for a piece that can move like a knight than chancellor, which has no connection to horses. Also, there are many commonly used chess pieces that, like chancellor, begin with C (e.g. the cannon in xiangqi, the camel in Tamerlane Chess, the champion in Omega Chess, and the cardinal or princess), and using the name marshal for the rook+knight compound would reduce this difficulty.

The name empress is the most widely used name among problemists. By analogy with the queen, which is a rook+bishop compound, it was suggested that the three basic combinations of the three simple chess pieces (rook, knight, and bishop) should all be named after female royalty. Since the rook+knight compound seemed to be obviously stronger than the bishop+knight compound (as the rook is stronger than the bishop), the name empress was used for the rook+knight compound, and the bishop+knight compound was called the princess. However, the word empress suggests a piece stronger than the queen, while this piece is at best equal to and perhaps weaker than the queen, especially in the endgame.

Value

Ralph Betza (inventor of chess with different armies, in which the empress was used in one of the armies) rated the empress as about nine points, equivalent to a queen, as the knight and bishop were about equal and the empress and queen were simply the knight and bishop with the power of a rook added to both. He noted that the queen may be slightly stronger than the empress in the endgame, but that the empress, on the other hand, has a greater ability to give perpetual checks and salvage a draw in an otherwise lost game. Unlike the queen, which can move in 8 different directions, the empress can move in 12.

In the endgame of king and amazon (queen+knight compound) versus king and empress, the amazon usually wins, but in a few positions, the weaker side may force a draw by setting up a fortress. These fortresses force the side with the amazon to give perpetual check, as otherwise the side with the empress can force a simplification or give its own perpetual check. King and empress versus king is a forced win for the side with the empress; checkmate can be forced within 11 moves. In comparison, the queen requires 10 moves, and the rook requires 16.

The drawing positions in the queen versus pawn endgame do not exist in the empress versus pawn endgame.

Examples

Many chess variants use a rook+knight compound, but due to its powerful ability, it is uncommon for variants to use more than one per colour on a normal 8×8 board. Seirawan chess uses one such piece (called an elephant) per colour. Capablanca chess uses one chancellor per colour on a 10×8 board.

Almost chess replaces queens with chancellors; these pieces are approximately equal in value.

Symbol
Both white and black symbols for the empress were added to version 12 of the Unicode standard in March 2019, in the Chess Symbols block:

🩏 U+1FA4F WHITE CHESS KNIGHT-ROOK
🩒 U+1FA52 BLACK CHESS KNIGHT-ROOK

See also
 Amazon—the rook+bishop+knight compound
 Princess—the bishop+knight compound
 Queen—the rook+bishop compound

Notes

References

Bibliography
 Piececlopedia: Rook–Knight Compound by Fergus Duniho and David Howe, The Chess Variant Pages
 Endgame statistics with fantasy pieces by Dave McCooey, The Chess Variant Pages
 The Remarkable Rookies (includes a section on the empress, where it appears in this army under the name chancellor) by Ralph Betza
 BuyPoint Chess by Ralph Betza; contains a list of pieces with approximate values
 Chigorin Chess at The Chess Variant Pages (Betza comments that the draws in the queen vs. pawn endgame are wins in the empress vs. pawn endgame)
 Great Chess - Indian / Turkish variant by Hans Bodlaender, The Chess Variant Pages

Fairy chess pieces